5244 Amphilochos  is a mid-sized Jupiter trojan from the Greek camp, approximately  in diameter. It was discovered at the Palomar Observatory during the second Palomar–Leiden Trojan survey in 1973, and was later named after the seer Amphilochus from Greek mythology. The dark Jovian asteroid is likely elongated in shape and has a rotation period of 7.8 hours.

Discovery 

Amphilochos was discovered on 29 September 1973, by Dutch astronomer couple Ingrid and Cornelis van Houten at Leiden, on photographic plates taken by astronomer Tom Gehrels at the Palomar Observatory in California. The body's observation arc begins with a precovery taken at Palomar in April 1955, more than 18 years prior to its official discovery observation.

Palomar–Leiden Trojan survey 

Despite being discovered during the second Palomar–Leiden Trojan survey in 1973, Amphilochos has not received a provisional survey designation prefixed with "T-2". The survey was a fruitful collaboration between the Palomar and Leiden observatories during the 1960s and 1970s. Gehrels used Palomar's Samuel Oschin telescope (also known as the 48-inch Schmidt Telescope), and shipped the photographic plates to Ingrid and Cornelis van Houten at Leiden Observatory where astrometry was carried out. The trio are credited with the discovery of several thousand asteroids.

Orbit and classification 

Amphilochos is a dark Jovian asteroid in a 1:1 orbital resonance with Jupiter. It is located in the leading Greek camp at the Gas Giant's  Lagrangian point, 60° ahead on its orbit . It is also a non-family asteroid of the Jovian background population.

It orbits the Sun at a distance of 5.0–5.3 AU once every 11 years and 9 months (4,297 days; semi-major axis of 5.17 AU). Its orbit has an eccentricity of 0.03 and an inclination of 6° with respect to the ecliptic.

Naming 

This minor planet was named from Greek mythology after the seer Amphilochus, son of Amphiaraus. After the Trojan War, he was warned by a vision which saved his life as he returned to the Trojan shore before the Greek fleet departed. Amphilochus lived together with Calchas (see 4138 Kalchas) in Asia Minor. The official naming citation was published by the Minor Planet Center on 26 February 1994.

Physical characteristics 

Amphilochos is an assumed C-type asteroid, while the majority of larger Jupiter trojans are D-types. It has an untypically low V–I color index of 0.77 (see table below).

Rotation period 

In September 2010, a first rotational lightcurve of Amphilochos was obtained from photometric observations in the R-band by astronomers at the Palomar Transient Factory. Lightcurve analysis gave a rotation period of 9.787 hours with a brightness variation of 0.51 magnitude. The best-rated lightcurve with a well-defined period of  hours and a high amplitude of 0.79 magnitude was obtained by Robert Stephens at the Center for Solar System Studies in Landers, California, in May 2015. A high brightness amplitude typically indicates that the body has a non-spherical shape.

In August 2015, observations by the Kepler space telescope during its K2 mission gave another two lightcurves with a concurring period of 9.578 and 9.797 hours with a brightness variation of 0.73 and 0.67 magnitude, respectively. The Collaborative Asteroid Lightcurve Link (CALL), labels the period determination for this asteroid as ambiguous.

Diameter and albedo 

According to the survey carried out by the NEOWISE mission of NASA's Wide-field Infrared Survey Explorer, Amphilochos measures 36.69 kilometers in diameter and its surface has an albedo of 0.091, while the Collaborative Asteroid Lightcurve Link assumes a standard albedo for a carbonaceous asteroid of 0.057 and calculates a diameter of 35.79 kilometers based on an absolute magnitude of 10.96.

Notes

References

External links 
 Asteroid Lightcurve Database (LCDB), query form (info )
 Dictionary of Minor Planet Names, Google books
 Discovery Circumstances: Numbered Minor Planets (5001)-(10000) – Minor Planet Center
 
 

005244
Discoveries by Cornelis Johannes van Houten
Discoveries by Ingrid van Houten-Groeneveld
Discoveries by Tom Gehrels
Named minor planets
19730929